Stuart Powell Field  is a public-use airport located  south of the central business district of Danville, a city in Boyle County, Kentucky, United States. It is owned by the City of Danville and Boyle County.

Although most U.S. airports use the same three-letter location identifier for the FAA and IATA, this airport is assigned DVK by the FAA but has no designation from the IATA.

Facilities and aircraft 

For the 12-month period ending May 8, 2018, the airport had 21,470 aircraft operations, an average of 59 per day: 80% general aviation, 17% air taxi and 2% military. As of May 8, 2018, 55 aircraft were based at this airport: 45 single-engine, 3 multi-engine, 4 jet, and 3 helicopter.

References

External links 
 

Airports in Kentucky
Danville, Kentucky
Buildings and structures in Boyle County, Kentucky